In the run up to the 2011 Spanish general election, various organisations carried out opinion polling to gauge the opinions that voters hold towards political leaders. Results of such polls are displayed in this article. The date range for these opinion polls is from the previous general election, held on 9 March 2008, to the day the next election was held, on 20 November 2011.

Preferred Prime Minister
The table below lists opinion polling on leader preferences to become Prime Minister.

Rubalcaba vs. Rajoy

Chacón vs. Rajoy

Zapatero vs. Rajoy

Predicted Prime Minister
The table below lists opinion polling on the perceived likelihood for each leader to become Prime Minister.

Rubalcaba vs. Rajoy

Chacón vs. Rajoy

Zapatero vs. Rajoy

Rubalcaba vs. Gallardón

Zapatero vs. Gallardón

Zapatero vs. Aguirre

Leader ratings
The table below lists opinion polling on leader ratings, on a 0–10 scale: 0 would stand for a "terrible" rating, whereas 10 would stand for "excellent".

Approval ratings
The tables below list the public approval ratings of the leaders and leading candidates of the main political parties in Spain.

Alfredo Pérez Rubalcaba

José Luis Rodríguez Zapatero

Mariano Rajoy

Gaspar Llamazares

Cayo Lara

References